The Bellanca CH-200 Pacemaker was a six-seat, high-wing, single-engine utility aircraft built in the United States in the 1920s. It was a development of the Wright WB-2 that Bellanca had acquired the rights to in 1926 and was the first Bellanca-branded aircraft to gain a type certificate. The CH-200 was used in a number of pioneering long-distance flights and attempts on distance and endurance records.

Operational history

At the 1928 Los Angeles Air Races, a CH-200 piloted by Victor Dallin took second place in the speed trials (average of ) and won the efficiency trials. The same year, Lt Royal Thomas set a world endurance record of 35 hours 25 minutes in the Reliance (NX4484).

Colonel Hubert Julian set another record in Bellanca J-2 Special NR782W (s/n 1101), a modified CH-200 re-engined with a Packard DR-980 diesel engine in which he stayed aloft for 84 hours and 32 minutes, a record for diesels which has never been broken.

Between 11 December 1928 and 25 June 1929, Peruvian aviators Carlos Martínez de Pinillos and Carlos Zegarra Lanfranco flew a CH-200 named Perú on a tour of Latin America. During that time, they covered  in 157 hours 55 minutes of total flight, visiting 13 countries and 25 cities.

Specifications

See also

References

 
 aerofiles.com
 shanaberger.com

1920s United States civil utility aircraft
CH-200
Single-engined tractor aircraft
High-wing aircraft
Aircraft first flown in 1928